The Borzhava (Hungarian: Borzsa) is a right tributary of the river Tisza in the Zakarpattia Oblast, western Ukraine. It rises in the Eastern Carpathians. It discharges into the Tisza near Vary, on the border with Hungary.

References

Rivers of Zakarpattia Oblast